Janet Young may refer to:

Janet Young, Baroness Young (1926–2002), British Conservative politician
Janet Young (tennis) (born 1951), Australian professional tennis player
 (ca 1889–1940), American actress